The AIFF Player of the Year Awards are the annual football awards presented to the best footballers in India by the All India Football Federation (AIFF). The AIFF first announced the award for Men's Player of the Year in 1992; I. M. Vijayan was the inaugural winner. Sunil Chhetri has won the award a record seven times, more than any other player. No winner was announced in 1998 and 1999. It was re-introduced in 2000.

The AIFF Women's Player of the Year Award was introduced in 2001. Oinam Bembem Devi was its first recipient. Between 2002 and 2012, no women's award was given out. In 2013, the award was re-introduced and Bembem Devi won it for the second time. Other than Bembem Devi, Bala Devi has also won the award twice, in 2015 and 2016. Along with the men's and women's awards, the AIFF Emerging Player of the Year Award for men was introduced in 2013, and a similar award for women was introduced in 2015.

Until 2016, the men's awards were selected on the basis of voting by the coaches of the I-League clubs. Since 2017, coaches of both the I-League and the Indian Super League have voted to select the winner.  The women's awards are selected by the head coach of the women's national team in consultation with the AIFF Technical Director.

Men's Player of the Year
I. M. Vijayan was the first player to receive the award in 1992. He was also the first player to win it consecutively in 1997 and 2000 (there was no award in 1998 and 1999). He has won the award three times. Sunil Chhetri has received the award a record seven times: in 2007, 2011, 2013, 2014, 2017, 2018−19 and most recently, 2021−22. Jo Paul Ancheri and Bhaichung Bhutia are the other players who have won this award more than once.

Women's Player of the Year
Oinam Bembem Devi was the first recipient of the award in 2001. Bembem Devi retained it in 2013, after the 2002–2012 halt ended. Bala Devi has won the award a record three times: in 2014, 2015 and 2020−21.

Emerging Player of the Year

See also

 FPAI Indian Player of the Year
 All India Football Federation
 Football in India

References

External links
 Official AIFF website.

All India Football Federation
Indian sports trophies and awards